Pinit Koeykorpkeo (born 5 December 1951) is a former Thai cyclist. He competed in the team time trial at the 1972 Summer Olympics.

References

External links
 

1951 births
Living people
Pinit Koeykorpkeo
Pinit Koeykorpkeo
Cyclists at the 1972 Summer Olympics
Place of birth missing (living people)
Pinit Koeykorpkeo